John Whitton (1820, near Wakefield, Yorkshire, England – 20 February 1898), an Anglo–Australian railway engineer, was the Engineer-in-Charge for the New South Wales Government Railways, serving between 1856 and 1890, considered the Father of New South Wales Railways. Under his supervision, it is estimated that  of railway around New South Wales and Victoria were completed. Whitton was responsible for the construction of parts of the Main Western railway line, in particular the section over the Blue Mountains and the Lithgow Zig Zag, and much of the Main Southern railway line.

Biography

Indentured in England, Whitton gained extensive railway engineering experience prior to his arrival in the Colony of New South Wales in 1856. He was an engineer for the Manchester, Sheffield and Lincoln railway line (1847), and supervised the building of the Oxford, Worcester and Wolverhampton line from 1852 to 1856.

Whitton strongly opposed the government's uncritical acceptance of the lowest tenders for railway construction.

Whitton did, however, introduce cheaper so-called pioneer lines for use in easier terrain once the mountains had been crossed.  Money was saved by building for lower speeds and the lightest of axleloads, with ash ballast, no fencing, etc.  These pioneer lines retained the same gauge as the main system.

Whitton was accused of fraud, along with his brother-in-law, Sir John Fowler, and the charges were proved groundless. Following a select committee on railway extension that recommended the construction of cheap narrow-gauge railways, necessitating a break of gauge within the Colony, as well as at the border; estimates were prepared but Whitton, determined to sabotage the committee's recommendation, suspended all surveys and new work. Whitton overcame the engineering problems and in 1876 completed the Blue Mountains line that included two zigzags. In 1880-85 the unprecedented growth in railways,  of new track and nine million more passengers exposed existing inadequacies in administration of railways. A royal commission into railway bridges exonerated Whitton of the charges of faulty design and of using inferior materials. In 1888 Henry Parkes's Government Railways Act reorganized the department and made Whitton's position easier.

In 1886 and 1887 Whitton submitted drawings for a proposed suspension bridge across Sydney Harbour from Dawes Point Battery to Milson's Point. On 1 May 1889 the Hawkesbury River Railway Bridge was opened; it was the final link in the railway system from Brisbane through Sydney to Melbourne and Adelaide and Whitton had fought for adequate finance for it.

However, by the end of his long tenure as Engineer-in-Chief, the British wrought-iron lattice truss bridge designs that Whitton employed had been superseded by lighter steel truss designs, following more modern American practice. The first Hawkesbury Railway Bridge was the first major rail bridge for which he had not specified the design. Whitton's successors would use steel truss designs for the other bridges built after he retired.

He was a member of the Hunter River floods commission 1869–70, the Sydney, City and Suburban Sewage and Health Board 1875–77, and the Board for Opening Tenders for Public Works 1875–87; he was a New South Wales commissioner for the Melbourne International Exhibition in 1880. Granted a year's leave on 29 May 1889, Whitton retired on 31 May 1890 with a pension of £675 and visited England in 1892. Parkes regarded him as 'a man of such rigid and unswerving integrity, a man of such vast grasp, that however, his faults may occasionally project themselves into prominence, it would be difficult to replace him by a man of equal qualifications'.

In international references, Whitton is recognised as one of approximately twenty of the greatest railway civil engineers in the first century of world railway construction.

Whitton was survived by his wife, one son and two daughters, he died of cardiac disease on 20 February 1898 at Mittagong, and was buried in the cemetery of St Thomas' Anglican Church, North Sydney. His estate was valued for probate at £10,396.

Significant completed works
An additional 37 other works are listed as significant in various local government areas.

Listed on the New South Wales State Heritage Register

Railway bridges, viaducts and other infrastructure

Railway stations

Listed by local government authorities

Railway bridges, viaducts and other infrastructure

Formerly the bottom road of the zig zag on the Main Western railway, the Glenbrook Tunnel Deviation led to the 1892 closure of the Lapstone Zig Zag.
The Victoria Bridge was converted from supporting the Main Western railway to road and pedestrian use in 1907.

Railway stations

Legacy 
The town of Whitton in Leeton Shire, where the Hay extension of the Great Southern Line reached in 1881, is named in honour. Whitton Park in Glenbrook and the May 1980 built John Whitton Bridge that carries the Main Northern line over the Parramatta River also bear his name. The bridge at Meadowbank stands next to an earlier iron lattice railway bridge that was constructed under his direction. A memorial dedicated to Whitton is located on the Lapstone Zig Zag walking trail and commemorates his substantial seven-span, sandstone Lapstone Knapsack Viaduct. A plaque bearing his contribution to New South Wales Railways was unveiled on 17 July 1985 at Central station, together with a bust on Chalmers Street, adjacent to the station.

In 2009 a rail activist group proposed the establishment of the Whitton Line, running from Port Macquarie to Albury via Narrabri, Dubbo, and Griffith.

Gallery

See also

Works of John Whitton

References

Further reading

Australian engineers
Australian people in rail transport
English civil engineers
English emigrants to Australia
People from Wakefield
1820 births
1898 deaths